Drug and Alcohol Review is a peer-reviewed medical journal covering research related to alcohol and drug-related problems. It is the official journal of the Australasian Professional Society on Alcohol and other Drugs.  It publishes seven issues annually.

The journal is published by Wiley and the editor-in-chief is Robin Room (La Trobe University). According to the Journal Citation Reports, the journal had an impact factor of 3.343 in 2020, ranking it 15th out of 37 journals in the category "Substance Abuse".

The journal was established in 1982 as Australian Alcohol – Drug Review, and changed its name to Australian Drug and Alcohol Review in 1986. In 1990 it obtained its current name.

See also
Alcohol and Drug Foundation
Foundation for Alcohol Research and Education

References

External links

Addiction medicine journals
Publications established in 1982
Wiley-Blackwell academic journals
Bimonthly journals
English-language journals
Academic journals associated with learned and professional societies